Terje Aa (born 16 March 1961) is a Norwegian bridge player, WBF World Life Master, and regular member of the Norwegian team since 1993. Teams on which he was a member have placed in the top three of the World Bridge Federation European and World Championships 11 times between 1984 and 2008.

In 1993, Aa debuted as the member of Norwegian national selection and won the Schiphol Invitational Teams in Netherlands and bronze medal in European Teams Championship in Menton, France. In the same year, they reached the final of Bermuda Bowl in Santiago de Chile, where they lost to the young Dutch team.

Aa works for the Norwegian Post Office. His regular partner between 1993 and 2006 was Glenn Grøtheim playing the "Viking Precision", a relay-based system.

Reporting false scores - suspension
Aa was a member of Geir Helgemo's team which reported a false score (claiming a match was played when it was not to the benefit of both teams) in a match in Norway. All players involved were suspended by the Norwegian Bridge Federation. Three of the players involved, Terje Aa (ACBL # 9027661), Geir Helgemo (ACBL # 4036808) and Jørgen Molberg (ACBL # 8896631) were members of the American Contract Bridge League (ACBL) and were suspended by the ACBL.

References

External links
 
 
 Viking Club system

Norwegian contract bridge players
Bermuda Bowl players
1961 births
Living people
People from Trondheim